A statue of a donkey, sometimes called Democratic Donkey, is installed outside Boston's Old City Hall, in the U.S. state of Massachusetts. Roger Webb acquired the bronze sculpture in Florence, Italy. It was installed outside Old City Hall in 1998.

The statue stares at a couple of footprints with the Conservative elephants.

References

External links
 Boston, Massachusetts: Democratic Donkey, Republican Footprints at RoadsideAmerica.com
 The Democratic Donkey – Boston, Massachusetts at Waymarking

1998 establishments in Massachusetts
Animal sculptures in Massachusetts
Bronze sculptures in Massachusetts
Donkeys in art
Outdoor sculptures in Boston
Political art
Statues in Boston